Johannes "Jan" Albertus Prinsloo (1935 – 1966) was a South African rugby union and professional rugby league footballer who played in the 1950s and 1960s.

Playing career

International honours
Jan Prinsloo won caps for South Africa (RU) while at Western Province against France on Saturday 26 July 1958, and against France on Saturday 16 August 1958, and represented Rugby League XIII (RL).

Club career
Jan Prinsloo was signed by St. Helens on 14 October 1958, he scored his first try for St. Helens as part of a two-try début against Rochdale Hornets on Saturday 8 November 1958. During the 1958–59 season Prinsloo scored hat-tricks against Salford and Blackpool Borough for a season total of 27-tries from 31 games. Prinsloo played a vital part in finishing dazzling moves for many a St. Helens victory including the sensational 1959 Championship Final win by 44 points to 22 over a great Hunslet side where Prinsloo exhibited a fabulous touchline dash rounded off with his trademark 'swallow dive' over the try-line. During the 1959–60 season Prinsloo scored 4-tries against Liverpool City and a hat-trick of tries against Hull FC, finishing the season with 29-tries from 38 matches. The following year brought more success with a hat-trick of tries against Workington Town, his last match for St. Helens was against Warrington on Saturday 7 January 1961. The transferring of both Prinsloo to Wakefield Trinity and Frank Carlton to Wigan paved the way for a £11,000 World Record transfer to bring Mick Sullivan to Knowsley Road. Prinsloo had the daunting task of wearing the St. Helens number five jersey at the same time as Tom van Vollenhoven was setting the whole game on fire on the other wing. His record and strike-rate demonstrates what a fine finisher Prinsloo was in rugby league. He made his début for Wakefield Trinity during February 1961, and he played his last match for Wakefield Trinity during the 1962–63 season.

County Cup Final appearances
Jan Prinsloo played , i.e. number 5, in St. Helens 4-5 defeat by Warrington in the 1959 Lancashire County Cup Final during the 1959–60 season at Central Park, Wigan on Saturday 31 October 1959, and played  in the 15-9 victory over Swinton in the 1960 Lancashire County Cup Final during the 1960–61 season at Central Park, Wigan on Saturday 29 October 1960 in front of a crowd of over 31,000.

References

External links
Search for "Prinsloo" at rugbyleagueproject.org
Profile at saints.org.uk
On This Day – 3 November
Search for "Jan Prinsloo" at britishnewspaperarchive.co.uk

1935 births
1966 deaths
Afrikaner people
Expatriate rugby league players in England
Sportspeople from Pretoria
Rugby league players from Gauteng
Rugby league wingers
Rugby League XIII players
Rugby union players from Pretoria
Rugby union wings
South Africa international rugby union players
South African expatriate rugby league players
South African expatriate sportspeople in England
South African people of Dutch descent
South African rugby league players
South African rugby union players
St Helens R.F.C. players
Wakefield Trinity players